Eugène-Guillaume Argenteau, comte de Mercy or Eugen Gillis Wilhelm Graf Mercy d'Argenteau (1743 – 4 May 1819) joined the Austrian army in 1760, became a general officer, and led large formations of soldiers in several actions during the French Revolutionary Wars and the Napoleonic Wars.

Early career

Born at Huy in the Austrian Netherlands in 1743, Argenteau joined the Mercy d'Argenteau Infantry Regiment Nr. 56 in 1760. That year he fought at the bloody Battle of Torgau. Before the Seven Years' War ended, he was present at the storming of Schweidnitz. Promoted to Major in 1773, he transferred to the Loudon Infantry Regiment Nr. 29. During the Austro-Turkish War (1787-1791), he led the 29th as their Oberst (colonel) and served with distinction at the Siege of Belgrade. In October 1789, he received promotion to General-major.

French Revolutionary Wars

In 1793, Argenteau served in the Italian theater as chief of staff to Joseph De Vins, the Austrian army commander. Apparently, he did not get along with the officers of their ally, the Kingdom of Sardinia. He continued to fight in northwestern Italy and was involved in at least two small actions. The French drove his troops from their positions during the Battle of Loano on 23 November 1795. He was brought before a Court-martial, but acquitted and in March 1796 promoted to Feldmarchal-Leutnant.

In April 1796, he commanded the Right Wing under a new army commander, Johann Beaulieu, a fellow Walloon. During the Montenotte Campaign, the French army under Napoleon Bonaparte mauled Argenteau's wing at the battles of Montenotte and Dego. After these defeats, Beaulieu's army remained largely paralyzed as the French knocked the Kingdom of Sardinia-Piedmont out of the First Coalition. Despite these events, Argenteau received the Knight's Cross of the Military Order of Maria Theresa in May 1796.

Napoleonic Wars

In 1805, Argenteau led a division in the army of Archduke Charles in northern Italy. At the Battle of Caldiero in October, he commanded five divisions of the Center of the army. At his retirement from military service in 1808, he was appointed Feldzeugmeister, full general. From 1809 until his death in 1819, he was proprietor (inhaber) of the Argenteau Infantry Regiment Nr. 35. He died in Vienna.

Notes

References
 Boycott-Brown, Martin. The Road to Rivoli. London: Cassell & Co., 2001.  
 Chandler, David G. The Campaigns of Napoleon. New York: Macmillan, 1966.
 Smith, Digby. The Napoleonic Wars Data Book. London: Greenhill, 1998. 
 Mercy d'Argenteau by Digby Smith, compiled by Leopold Kudrna

1741 births
1819 deaths
People from Huy
Austrian soldiers
Austrian generals
Belgian soldiers
Austrian Empire commanders of the Napoleonic Wars
Austrian Empire military leaders of the French Revolutionary Wars
Military leaders of the French Revolutionary Wars